Clean Break is a feminist theatre company started in 1979 by Jenny Hicks and Jackie Holborough, while inmates of HMP Askham Grange. They expanded the prison's annual Christmas show into Efemera, a two-hour show about prison life. It was later performed for a two-night run at York Arts Centre, which made its 21 cast members the first British prisoners to perform onstage outside of a prison. Upon their release Hicks and Holborough formed the theatre company, Clean Break in order to tell the hidden stories of women in prison. 

The company also organises residencies in women's prisons in the UK, using directors, playwrights and actors to work with inmates to create their own work. In 1998 the company moved from its base in Camden to a refurbished building in Kentish Town.

The playwright Lucy Kirkwood, was writer in residence at Clean Break. Productions include Sam Holcroft's Dancing Bears at the Soho Theatre, Little on the inside by Alice Birch at the Edinburgh Festival Fringe 2014 and Pests by Vivienne Franzmann (a co-production with Royal Court Theatre & Royal Exchange Theatre 2014. [BLANK], a play by Alice Birch, premiered at the Donmar Warehouse in October 2019. In 2019 Inside Bitch was performed at Theatre Upstairs at The Royal Court Theatre. In 2021, Typical Girls by Morgan Lloyd Malcolm ran at Sheffield Theatres, and in 2022 Favour by Ambreen Razia premiered at Bush Theatre.

Clean Break trustee Alice Millest was named Young Board Member of the Year at the 2014 Arts & Business Awards.

Clean Break were shortlisted for the Guardian Charity of the Year Awards in 2014 and received a Highly Commended Award from the Longford Trust.

References

External links 
 Clean Break Official Website

Feminist theatre
Charities based in London
Theatre companies in the United Kingdom